Hot FM may refer to a number of radio stations:
Hot FM (Australian radio network), in Queensland and Western Australia, owned by Southern Cross Austereo and Prime Television
Hot FM (Philippine radio network), throughout the Philippines, owned by Manila Broadcasting Company
Hot FM network, in the United Kingdom, formerly owned by Chiltern Radio Group
Hot FM (Malaysia), in Petaling Jaya, Selangor, Malaysia, owned by Media Prima
Hot 100 FM in Darwin, Northern Territory, Australia
One FM 91.3, previously known as HOT FM 91.3, in Singapore, owned by SPH Media Trust
WKHL (FM), known as Hot 92.1, in Harrisburg, Pennsylvania, USA, owned by Cumulus Broadcasting
KBCQ-FM, known as Hot 97, in New Mexico, USA, owned by Roswell Radio
WQHT-FM, known as Hot 97, in New York City, USA, owned by Emmis Communications
WHZT, known as The New Hot 98-1, in Greenville/Spartanburg, South Carolina, USA, owned by Cox Media Group
WIHT, known as Hot 99.5, in Washington D.C., USA, owned by iHeartMedia
KHQT, known as Hot 103, in Las Cruces, New Mexico, USA, owned by Richardson Commercial Corporation
KKLS-FM, known as Hot 104.7, in Sioux Falls, South Dakota, USA, owned by Cumulus Media
WHQT, known as Hot 105 FM, in South Florida, USA, owned by Cox Radio
CJNW-FM, known as Hot 107, in Edmonton, Alberta, Canada, owned by John Charles Yerxa
WUHT known as Hot 107.7, in Birmingham, Alabama, USA, owned by UAB Blazers Radio Network
KHXT, known as Hot 107.9, in Erath, Louisiana, USA, owned by Regent Communications
WJFX, known as Hot 107.9, in Fort Wayne, Indiana, USA, owned by Oasis Radio Group